Ludmila Richterová won in the final 6–7, 6–4, 6–3 against Patricia Hy-Boulais.

Seeds
A champion seed is indicated in bold text while text in italics indicates the round in which that seed was eliminated.

  Mana Endo (first round)
  Chanda Rubin (quarterfinals)
 n/a
  Ruxandra Dragomir (second round)
  Katarzyna Nowak (first round)
  Patty Fendick (second round)
  Åsa Carlsson (semifinals)
 n/a

Draw

External links
 1995 Rover British Clay Court Championships Draw

Women's Singles, 1995
Rover British Clay Court Championships – Singles
Rover British Clay Court Championships – Singles
Rover British Clay Court Championships – Singles